Chater Garden, located in the Central District of Hong Kong, is a public park directly east of the Legislative Council building. It is named after Sir Paul Chater, as is the adjacent Chater Road.

History

In the early days of British rule in Hong Kong, the site was part of the Murray Parade Ground. Then in 1851, it was opened as a sports and recreation area and became home to the Hong Kong Cricket Club and its ground. In 1975, Chater Garden took up the space left by the club when it moved to Wong Nai Chung Gap. The garden was developed in the 1970s, and formally opened on 20 October 1978.

Due to its proximity to the seat of government, the garden has been used as a location for political rallies and demonstrations by groups in Hong Kong such as Falun Gong.

See also
 Central and Western Heritage Trail
 List of urban public parks and gardens in Hong Kong

References

External links 
 
 Map of the Central/Chater Garden area

Central, Hong Kong
Urban public parks and gardens in Hong Kong